South Boulevard–Park Row Historic District is located in the southern part of Dallas, Texas.

It was added to the National Register on February 5, 1979.

See also

National Register of Historic Places listings in Dallas County, Texas
List of Dallas Landmarks

References

External links

National Register of Historic Places in Dallas
Geography of Dallas
Historic districts on the National Register of Historic Places in Texas